Jean-Pierre Clément (2 June 1809 – 8 November 1870; known as Pierre Clément) was a French political economist and historian, born at Draguignan.  He was in the Ministry of Finance and a member of the Institute and wrote, with the aid of original documents, works on French financial administration, particularly in the epoch of Colbert, including:

Histoire de la vie et de l'administration de Colbert (1846)  
Histoire du systéme protecteur en France depuis Colbert jusqu'à la révolution de 1848 (1854)  
Etudes financières et d'economie sociale (1859)  
Lettres, instructions, et Mémoires de Colbert (seven volumes, 1861–1882)

Clément's prefaces to the last work were collected and edited by his widow under the title Histoire de Colbert et de son administration (1874; third edition, 1892)

Clément was an early member of the Société d'économie politique organized by Pellegrino Rossi.

References

External links
 
 

1809 births
1870 deaths
French male non-fiction writers
19th-century French historians
19th-century French male writers